Foreign official or foreign public official refers to a person who acts in an official capacity for a foreign government. The term is chiefly used in connection with international conventions and national laws against corruption in international trade.

International law
Members of the Organization for Economic Cooperation and Development (OECD) agreed the OECD Anti-Bribery Convention in 1999 and this treaty has been ratified by 39 countries. The document defines a foreign public official as follows:

And expands the definition as such:

The definition of a foreign official defined in the OECD agreement is now referenced in enforcement actions by the United States Department of Justice.

National jurisdictions

US Department of Justice definition
According to the US Department of Justice, the term "foreign official" is defined as:

The Foreign Corrupt Practices Act applies to US companies and foreign organisations or persons doing business within the borders of the United States. This definition also applies to issuers of publicly traded securities (companies traded on US stock exchanges and in other US markets). The intent of the law is to stop the bribing of foreign officials so that the actual providing of funds to foreign governments directly would not constitute a violation.

Risks of business with foreign officials
The process of recognising if an entity is doing business with an individual who would be considered a foreign official is not only necessary from a compliance perspective, but also necessary when evaluating the risks in a company's business model. This process can be very simple or may be quite complex depending on how many relationships an entity has in place.  The process of identifying foreign officials is typically carried out by the comparisons of client or third-party lists with lists of foreign officials that contain the names and positions of such officials, as well as unique identifiers such as dates of birth, photos, and contact numbers.

The term foreign official should not be confused with the term "politically exposed person", as this term relates to the financial sector and its clients. The term "foreign official" relates to all industries.

See also
 Bribery Act 2010 (United Kingdom)
 Corruption of Foreign Public Officials Act (Canada)
 OECD Anti-Bribery Convention
 Politically Exposed Person

References

United States foreign relations legislation
Corruption in the United States